Cordyla can refer to the following:

 Cordyla, a genus of legumes
 Cordyla, a synonym of the orchid genus Nervilia, as described by Blume
 Cordyla (fly), a genus of fungus gnat